Nogometni klub Radenska Slatina or simply NK Radenska Slatina is a Slovenian football club which plays in the town of Radenci. The club was established in 1997 and play their home matches in green and white kits. Their main rivals are ŠNK Radgona.

League history since 2002

References

Association football clubs established in 1997
Football clubs in Slovenia
1997 establishments in Slovenia